Motogoya Dam  is a gravity dam located in Hokkaido Prefecture in Japan. The dam is used for power production. The catchment area of the dam is 408.8 km2. The dam impounds about 27  ha of land when full and can store 2610 thousand cubic meters of water. The construction of the dam was and completed in 1960.

References

Dams in Hokkaido